2007 European Youth Olympic Festival may refer to:

2007 European Youth Summer Olympic Festival
2007 European Youth Olympic Winter Festival